The National Society of Coppersmiths, Braziers and Metal Workers was a trade union representing foundry workers in the United Kingdom.

The union was established in 1846 as the London and Provincial Society of Coppersmiths.  It grew very slowly, reaching 464 members by 1900.  In 1910, it changed its name to the "National Society of Coppersmiths, Braziers and Metal Workers", extending its potential membership, which immediately rose to 775.  By the 1950s, it had a membership of around 6,000 workers, mostly based in London.

In July 1959, the union merged with the rival National Union of Sheet Metal Workers and Braziers to form the National Union of Sheet Metal Workers and Coppersmiths.

General Secretaries
1904: George Rick
1910: Henry Stansfield
1947: Harold E. Poole

References

External links
Catalogue of the Society archives, held at the Modern Records Centre, University of Warwick

Trade unions established in the 1840s
Trade unions disestablished in 1959
Defunct trade unions of the United Kingdom
Sheet metal workers' trade unions
Trade unions based in London